Redonda is an uninhabited island in the Caribbean.

Redonda may also refer to:

 Kingdom of Redonda, a micronation of the island Redonda
 Redonda (genus), a butterfly genus

See also
 Co-cathedral of Santa María de la Redonda, Spain
 Redondo (disambiguation)
 Whole note, musical term represented by the word "redonda" in Spanish